Varduhi Avetisyan (born February 27, 1986, in Armenian SSR) is an Armenian retired swimmer. She competed at the 2004 Summer Olympics in the women's 100 metre breaststroke.

References

External links
Sports-Reference.com

1986 births
Living people
Armenian female breaststroke swimmers
Olympic swimmers of Armenia
Swimmers at the 2004 Summer Olympics